was a career military officer and a lieutenant-general of the Imperial Japanese Army in World War II.

Life

Born in the city of Kofu, Yamanashi Prefecture, Tsutsumi graduated from the Imperial Japanese Army Academy in 1922.

He took part in the invasion of Manchuria as Chief of Staff of the 10th Infantry Division.  The division was deployed to the Asian continent during the Mukden Incident in September 1931 and remained stationed in Manchuria afterwards, participating in the Chinchow Operation of 1932.  The division returned to Japan in March 1934.

In October 1943, he was assigned command of the Japanese defenses of the Kuril Islands. In April 1944, he formed the 91st Infantry Division. He led the defense of the northern Kuril islands during the Kuril landing operation and the Battle of Shumshu. On August 23, 1945, he signed the terms to surrender his troops to the invading Soviet Union.

References

1890 births
1959 deaths
Japanese generals
Imperial Japanese Army generals of World War II
Imperial Japanese Army personnel of World War II
Military personnel from Yamanashi Prefecture
People from Kōfu, Yamanashi